The discography of American rapper, singer and songwriter Futuristic consists of ten studio albums, two collaboration albums, three extended plays and 96 singles (including 29 singles as a featured artist).

Albums

Studio albums

Collaborative albums

Extended plays

Singles

As lead artist

As featured artist

Guest appearances

Notes

References

Discographies of American artists
Hip hop discographies